Gennadiy Vladimirovich Borisov (born in 1962 in Kramatorsk) is a Crimean telescope maker and amateur astronomer who discovered the first-known interstellar comet, 2I/Borisov, in 2019.

Work 
There he maintains the telescopes, but does not make observations himself. He also works with Astronomicheskiy Nauchnyy Tsentr JSC, creating experimental telescopes in collaboration with Roscosmos.

Borisov pursues astronomy in his spare time at his personal observatory MARGO located in Nauchnyi, in the southern part of the Crimean peninsula. These discoveries were made using telescopes he designed and built himself: GENON (2 comets), GENON Max (5 comets) and the unnamed 0.65 m telescope (2 comets, including 2I/Borisov). In 2014, Borisov received two Edgar Wilson Awards for his discoveries of C/2013 N4 and C/2013 V2. Borisov also discovered the asteroid 2023 BU, another near-Earth object that passed within 4,000 km of the Earth in January 2023.

Discovery of 2I/Borisov 
In early 2019, Borisov completed his new 0.65-meter telescope. On August 30, 2019, he used this telescope to discover the first known interstellar comet, 2I/Borisov, which is only the second interstellar object to have been observed.

Borisov described his discovery thus:

The discovery of 2I/Borisov by Gennadiy Borisov has been compared to the discovery of Pluto by Clyde Tombaugh. Tombaugh was also an amateur astronomer who was building his own telescopes, although he discovered Pluto using Lowell Observatory's astrograph.

Discovery of 2023 BU 
On January 21st 2023, Borisov discovered the relatively small asteroid 2023 BU, only 5 days before it would pass an initially calculated  from the centerpoint of Earth, closer than geostationary satellites but further than low earth orbit satellites.

Views 
Borisov thinks that soon amateur astronomers will no longer be able to discover new comets: "In 2016, only I discovered a comet. In 2013, there were seven of us. Every year there are less and less. There are more and more huge telescopes. Amateurs will soon have nothing left."

Notes

References

External links 
 A video interview with Borisov (in Russian, but subtitles can be enabled with auto-translation into English)

Discoverers of comets
1962 births
Living people
Russian astronomers
Ukrainian astronomers